The Raleigh and Augusta Air Line Railroad was a North Carolina railroad that operated in the second half of the 19th century.

History

Early years
The Raleigh and Augusta Air Line Railroad traces its history back to the early 1850s, when the line was chartered by the North Carolina General Assembly as the Chatham Railroad in February 1851. It changed its name to the Raleigh and Augusta Air Line Railroad in 1871, and was chartered by the South Carolina General Assembly in February 1878.

In 1871, the Chatham Railroad was reorganized as the Raleigh and Augusta Air Line Railroad. The carrier's goal was to build a line from Raleigh to Augusta, Georgia, through Columbia, South Carolina. However, it never progressed past the North Carolina-South Carolina state line, where it met the Palmetto Railroad.

The Raleigh and Gaston Railroad controlled the Raleigh and Augusta Air Line Railroad, owning most of its stock. By 1884, the Raleigh and Augusta stretched from Raleigh, North Carolina south to Hamlet, then on to the South Carolina border at Gibson. Later, the Raleigh and Gaston, and Raleigh and Augusta both fell on hard times during the Panic of 1873, and John M. Robinson, president of the Seaboard and Roanoke Railroad, acquired financial control of both carriers, becoming president of all three railroads in 1875.

Mergers
By 1881, the Seaboard and Roanoke, the Raleigh and Gaston, and others were operating as a coordinated system under the Seaboard Air-Line System name for marketing purposes, combining the nicknames of the two principal roads.

In November 1899, stockholders of the Raleigh and Gaston Railroad considered the consolidation of the Raleigh and Gaston with the following other roads:
Raleigh and Augusta Air Line Railroad
Durham and Northern Railway
Roanoke and Tar River Railroad
Seaboard and Roanoke Railroad
Louisburg Railroad
Carolina Central Railroad
Palmetto Railroad
Chesterfield and Kershaw Railroad
Georgia, Carolina and Northern Railway
Seaboard Air Line Belt Railroad
Georgia and Alabama Railroad
Florida Central and Peninsular Railroad
Georgia and Alabama Terminal Company
Logansville and Lawrenceville Railroad
Richmond, Petersburg and Carolina Railroad
Pittsboro Railroad
Southbound Railroad

The resulting company became known as the Seaboard Air Line Railroad. The Raleigh and Augusta Air Line was merged into the Seaboard in November 1901.

In 1967, the Seaboard Air Line merged with its rival, the Atlantic Coast Line Railroad.  The merged company was named the Seaboard Coast Line Railroad.
In 1980, the Seaboard Coast Line's parent company merged with the Chessie System, creating the CSX Corporation.  The CSX Corporation initially operated the Chessie and Seaboard Systems separately until 1986, when they were merged into CSX Transportation.  The line is still in service and it is part of CSX's S Line (Aberdeen Subdivision and Hamlet Terminal Subdivision).

Station Listing

References

Defunct South Carolina railroads
Defunct North Carolina railroads
Railway companies established in 1871
Railway companies disestablished in 1901
Predecessors of the Seaboard Air Line Railroad
American companies established in 1871